The dong (Vietnamese: đồng, Chữ Nôm: 銅) (sign: ₫ or informally đ in Vietnamese; code: VND) has been the currency of Vietnam since 3 May 1978. It is issued by the State Bank of Vietnam. The dong was also the currency of the predecessor states of North Vietnam and South Vietnam, having replaced the previously used French Indochinese piastre.

Formerly, it was subdivided into 10 hao (hào), which were further subdivided into 10 xu, neither of which are now used due to inflation. The Vietnamese dong has increasingly moved towards exclusively using banknotes, with lower denominations printed on paper and denominations over 10,000 dong, worth about 40¢ dollar or euro, printed on polymer, as of 2022 no coins are used. Generally, Vietnam is moving towards digital payments.

As of December 2022, the Vietnamese dong was the third-lowest valued currency unit (behind the Venezuelan bolivar and Iranian rial), with one United States dollar equalling around 23,575 dong.

Etymology
The word "dong" came from the material which the pennies were made (bronze). The term refers to bronze coins used in feudal China and Vietnam. The term "hao" is a loanword from the Chinese háo, meaning a tenth of a currency unit, while "xu" came from French sou.  The sign is encoded .

History

French Indochina

The piastre (known in Vietnam as "silver"), was the currency of French Indochina between 1885 and 1952.

North Vietnam

In 1946, the Viet Minh government (later to become the government of North Vietnam) introduced its own currency, the dong, to replace the French Indochinese piastre at par. Two revaluations followed, in 1951 and 1959; the first was at a rate of 100:1, the second at a rate of 1,000:1.

South Vietnam

Notes dually denominated in piastres and dong were issued in 1953 for the State of Vietnam, which evolved into South Vietnam in 1954. On 22 September 1975, after the fall of Saigon, the currency in South Vietnam was changed to a "liberation dong" worth 500 old Southern dong.

United Vietnam and inflation
After Vietnam was reunified, the dong was also unified on 3 May 1978. One new dong equalled one Northern dong or 0.8 Southern "liberation" dong.

On 14 September 1985, the dong was revalued again, with one new dong worth 10 old dong. At that time, Vietnamese economists believed that revaluing the currency would increase its value, but it turned out to have the opposite effect: savings of many people were wiped out, the currency experienced unprecedently heavy inflation that peaked at 774.7% in 1986 and prices skyrocketed. For example, in 1986, the price of agricultural products increased by 2000% compared to ten years before. To aggravate this problem, the government banned all forms of non-state-owned internal trade, which they believed to be capitalistic, resulting in an economic crisis so severe that Tố Hữu referred to it as a "vertical downturn". Despite the inflation rates having stabilised as part of the Đổi Mới reforms, especially during the 1990s and early 2000s, the effects of the crisis still last in the value of the dong, one of the lowest in the world today.

Coins

First dong
In 1978, aluminium coins dated 1976 were introduced in denominations of 1, 2 and 5 hao, as well as 1 dong. The coins were minted by the Berlin Mint in the German Democratic Republic and bear the state crest on the obverse and denomination on the reverse. Due to the chronic inflation experienced by Vietnam during the 1980s and 1990s, these coins lost all their relevant value and no coins were circulated for many years after this series.

Second dong

Commemorative issues
Commemorative coins in copper, brass, copper-nickel, silver, and gold have been issued since 1986, but none of these have ever been used in circulation.

2003 issue
The State Bank of Vietnam resumed issuing coins on December 17, 2003.  The new coins, minted by the Mint of Finland, were in denominations of 200, 500, 1,000, 2,000, and 5,000 dong in either nickel-clad steel or brass-clad steel. Prior to its reintroduction, Vietnamese consumers had to exchange banknotes for tokens with a clerk before purchasing goods from vending machines. This was also to help the state ease the cost of producing large quantities of small denomination banknotes, which tended to wear easily. Many residents expressed excitement at seeing coins reappear after many years, as well as concern for the limited usefulness of the 200 dong coins due to ongoing inflationary pressures.

Since the launch of the 2003 coin series, the State Bank has had some difficulties with making the acceptance of coins universal despite the partial discontinuation of smaller notes, to the point of some banks refusing coin cash deposits or the cashing in of large numbers of coins. This has prompted laws requiring private and municipal banks to transact and offer services for coins and the full discontinuation of small denomination and cotton-based notes. Also, the coins did not gain popularity from the Vietnamese people. Eventually, State Bank of Vietnam withdrew its distribution in April 2011.

Banknotes

First dong
In 1978, the State Bank of Vietnam (Ngân hàng Nhà nước Việt Nam) introduced notes in denominations of 5 hao, 1, 5, 10, 20, and 50 dong dated 1976. In 1980, 2 and 10 dong notes were added, followed by 30 and 100 dong notes in 1981. These notes were discontinued in 1985 as they gradually lost value due to inflation and economic instability.

Second dong
In 1985, notes were introduced in denominations of 5 hao, 1, 2, 5, 10, 20, 30, 50, 100, and 500 dong. As inflation became endemic, these first banknotes were followed by 200, 1,000, 2,000, and 5,000 dong notes in 1987, by 10,000 and 50,000 dong notes in 1990, by a 20,000 dong note in 1991, a 100,000 dong note in 1994, a 500,000 dong note in 2003, and a 200,000 dong note in 2006. Banknotes with denominations of 5,000 dong and under have been discontinued from production, but as of 2015 are still in wide circulation.

Five banknote series have appeared. Except for the current series, dated 2003, all were confusing to the user, lacking unified themes and coordination in their designs. The first table below shows the latest banknotes, of 100 dong or higher, prior to the current series.
On 7 June 2007, the government ordered cessation of the issuance of the cotton 50,000 and 100,000 dong notes. They were taken out of circulation by 1 September 2007. State Bank of Vietnam 10,000 and 20,000 dong cotton notes are no longer in circulation as of 1 January 2013.

In 2003 Vietnam began replacing its cotton banknotes with plastic polymer banknotes, claiming that this would reduce the cost of printing.  Many newspapers in the country criticized these changes, citing mistakes in printing and alleging that the son of the governor of the State Bank of Vietnam benefited from printing contracts.  The government clamped down on these criticisms by banning two newspapers from publishing for a month and considering other sanctions against other newspapers.
Even though the 2003 series banknotes listed in the table below have now completely replaced the old notes of the same denominations, as of 2019 the cotton fibre banknotes of 200, 500, 1,000, 2,000, and 5,000 dong still remain in wide circulation and are universally accepted.

A commemorative polymer 50 dong banknote dedicated to the fiftieth anniversary of the State Bank of Vietnam was issued in 2001, but its face value is so tiny that it clearly was meant only for collectors. The note is available in three forms, by itself, in a presentation folder or in a presentation folder in an envelope. In 2016, a 100 dong banknote was issued on cotton-based paper to commemorate the 65th anniversary of central banking.

Bearer's checks 1992–2002
To support the growing industrial need for large money transactions,
the State Bank issued "Bearer's Checks" or "State Bank Settlement Checks"
(Ngân Phiếu Thanh Toán) in denominations from 100,000 to 5,000,000 dong.
To prevent counterfeiting, these notes had many degrees of protection,
their designs were changed every five to six months, and they had expiration dates five or six months after the date of issue.
The checks worked until the banking system was upgraded to handle electronic transfers of large amounts of đồng, making most large cash transactions unnecessary.

Other uses of dong
In the Vietnamese language, đồng can be used as a generic term for any currency by adding the name of a country as a qualifier. This practice is more common for more esoteric units of currency.

In present-day Vietnam, when mentioning an amount of money, the currency can be (and usually is) omitted and is replaced by words like "thousand", "million", and "billion".

Exchange rate

After the revaluation of the Zimbabwean dollar on 1 August 2006, the dong became the least valued currency unit for months. Around 21 March 2007, the revalued Zimbabwean dollar regained least valued currency status (in terms of black market exchange rate), and on 7 September 2007 in terms of official exchange rate. After the use of the Zimbabwean dollar ceased on 12 April 2009, the dong was the second least valued currency unit after the Iranian rial as of 28 November 2014. Since 19 June 2014, the Vietnamese dong has been devalued a total of five times in an effort to help spur exports and to ensure the stability of the currency.

(Sources: tradingeconomics.com, imf.org)

See also
Vietnamese cash
VND Index
Economy of Vietnam

References

External links 

Coins and Banknotes of Vietnam and French Indochina

Currency symbols
Currencies of Vietnam
Currencies introduced in 1978